Melzavod is a rural locality (a settlement) in Medveditskoye Urban Settlement, Zhirnovsky District, Volgograd Oblast, Russia. The population was 172 as of 2010. There are 3 streets.

Geography 
Melzavod is located in steppe of Volga Upland, on the left bank of the Dobrinka River, 27 km southwest of Zhirnovsk (the district's administrative centre) by road. Nizhnyaya Dobrinka is the nearest rural locality.

References 

Rural localities in Zhirnovsky District